Breteuil (also called Breteuil-sur-Iton) is a commune in the Eure department in Normandy in northern France. On 1 January 2016, the former communes Cintray and La Guéroulde were merged into Breteuil.

Population

See also
Communes of the Eure department

References

Communes of Eure